The discography of John Paul Young consists of nine studio albums, nine compilation albums, one EP and 37 singles.
As of October 1978, Young had four platinum albums and nine gold singles in Australia.

Albums

Studio albums

Compilation albums

Extended plays

Singles

Other singles

References

Discographies of Australian artists
Pop music discographies